Vineeta Singh is an Indian entrepreneur and CEO and co-founder of Sugar Cosmetics. She has been a shark (i.e. judge/investor) on the business reality TV show Shark Tank India since the show started airing on SonyLIV in 2021.

Early life and education
Singh was born in 1983 in Anand, Gujarat. Her mother holds a PhD and her father Tej P. Singh is a biophysicist at the All India Institutes of Medical Sciences.

Singh completed her school education at Delhi Public School, R. K. Puram in 2001. Entrepreneurship already appealed to her when joining Indian Institute of Technology (Madras) in that year, as Ashok Jhunjhunwala recalls from his first meeting with the young student in the foreword of the book The IITM Nexus:

Singh completed her electrical engineering studies at IIT-M and earned the bachelor's degree in 2005. Afterward, she obtained an MBA from Indian Institute of Management (Ahmedabad) in 2007. During her MBA studies, in 2006, she worked as a summer intern at Deutsche Bank and rejected a job from that company despite an annual Rs 1 crore salary. Singh and the other graduate who rejected the same offer wanted to instead start their own lingerie business, based on their own research. However, unable to raise the required funding, the aspiration to start a consumer brand for women did not take off.

Career
In 2007, Singh founded her first start-up Quetzal. However, the idea of providing background verification checks to recruiters failed to succeed in this very cost-driven market. She started her second start-up Fab-Bag in 2012, a subscription platform that provided monthly deliveries of beauty products. Her third start-up, Sugar Cosmetics, Singh founded together with her husband in 2015. The company sells cosmetics and personal care products geared towards the Indian market. In a BBC interview, Singh recounts that her hiring strategy is closely related to marketing, as many young Indian women in her work force create a company culture close to the target consumers. After closing a $50 million seal with private equity firm L Catterton, Singh characterized the company's products as catering to the preferences of women with diverse skin tones. In September 2022, Bollywood star Ranveer Singh invested an undisclosed amount and became a "brand evangelist" of Sugar Cosmetics.

Singh appeared on the hard copy cover pages of business magazines, such as Forbes India, Business Today, and Businessworld. In the associated cover story, Singh tells Forbes about her journey as a female entrepreneur, from failures to exponential economic growth. To Business Today, she revealed that funding was once only granted under the condition that her husband joined the company full-time, which she viewed as gender discrimination. With Businessworld, she shared her vision to change the narrative of the Indian female workforce and "inspire young girls to dream big".

In 2021, Forbes India listed Singh as one of its Forbes India W-Power list of women achievers.

Entertainment
Singh is one of the major investors/judges on the business reality show Shark Tank India. As part of her appearance on the show, she aims to inspire entrepreneurship in general and support female entrepreneurs.

In 2022, Singh along with the other Shark Tank India judges appeared as a VIP contestant in Kaun Banega Crorepati, the Indian version of Who Wants to Be a Millionaire. She also appeared as a guest on The Kapil Sharma Show together with other Shark Tank India judges in the same year.

Awards and recognition
Singh, respectively her start-up Sugar Cosmetics, received the following awards related to her entrepreneurship:
 Start-up of the year award by Entrepreneur Awards, Delhi (2019).
 W-Power Award by Forbes India (2021).
 BW Disrupt 40 Under 40 Award by Businessworld (2021).
 Fortune's 40 Under 40 (2021).
 World Economic Forum's Young Global Leadership list (2022).
 She won 2 Gold and 2 Silver medal for IIT Madras during the 4 Inter IIT Sports Meets attended from 2001–2005.

Personal life
In 2011, Vineeta Singh married Kaushik Mukherjee and the couple have two sons. She met Kaushik during their studies at IIM Ahmedabad.

Singh is a triathlete and ultramarathon runner and has participated in 20 marathons, ultramarathons, and 12 half-marathons. She also took part in the 89-km Comrades Marathon from 2012 to 2014. She completed the 2017 Ironman Triathlon in Kailua-Kona, Hawaii. In the 2018 Mumbai Marathon, she ran a total of 21 km in 2:42:51s while being 6 months pregnant.

References

Indian businesspeople
IIT Madras alumni
People from Anand district
Indian company founders
Women founders
1983 births
Living people